The International is a play by the American playwright John Howard Lawson. It was first produced by the New Playwrights' Theatre in New York, opening on January 12 1928. Lawson directed this production, while John Dos Passos designed the sets, Edward A. Ziman composed its music, Don Oscar Becque choreographed the dances, and Helen Johnson designed the costumes.

Characters
 Simeon Silas Fitch
 Edward Elliott Spunk
 Ethel
 David Fitch
 T. Jerome Henley
 Karneski
 Alise
 Rubeloff (Soviet Commissar)
 The Living Buddha of Lhasa
 Tim
 Madam Miau
 Gussie
 General Fitzmaurice (of the British Army)
 Monsieur Fouchard (of the French Ministry)
 Benjamin Krumb
 Marines
 Native Soldiers
 Gendarmes
 Workmen

Sources
 Lawson, John Howard. 1927. The International. New York: The Macaulay Company.

External links
 

1928 plays
Broadway plays
Plays by John Howard Lawson
Modernist theatre